Equator is an album by Randy Stonehill, released in 1983, on Myrrh Records. It has not been released on CD.

Track listing 

All songs written by Randy Stonehill, except "Light of the World" by Randy Stonehill and Wayne Berry, and "Hide Them In Your Love" by Randy Stonehill and Gary Morris.

Side one
 "Light of the World" – 4:10
 "Big Ideas (In a Shrinking World)" – 4:37
 "Shut De Dó" – 2:46
 "Even the Best of Friends" – 4:52
 "American Fast Food" – 3:19

Side two
 "China" – 5:32
 "Cosmetic Fixation" – 4:17
 "Turning Thirty" – 3:49
 "Hide Them In Your Love" – 3:29
 "World Without Pain" – 3:54

Personnel 
Musicians
 Randy Stonehill – lead vocals, acoustic guitar, electric guitars
 Tom Howard – keyboards
 Mark Cook – additional keyboards (4)
 Rob Watson – additional keyboards (4, 7)
 Derri Daugherty – additional electric rhythm guitar (5, 6)
 Jim Nicholson – lead guitar (6, 9)
 Jerry Chamberlain – lead guitar (7)
 Tim Chandler – bass guitar, lead guitar (10)
 Alex MacDougall – drums (1-5, 7-10), percussion
 Ed McTaggart – drums (6)
 Terry Scott Taylor – drums (6)
 Doll (MacDougall) Gallienne – vibraphone (2), xylophone (2), bagpipes (2)
 Adrian Tapia – saxophone (4, 5), flute (6)
Handclaps (Tracks 3 & 5)
 Tim Alderson, Jerry Chamberlain, Sharon McCall, Randy Stonehill and Terry Scott Taylor

Backing vocals
 Randy Stonehill (1, 2, 4-10)
 Jerry Chamberlain (1, 2, 4-7, 9, 10)
 Tom Howard (1, 5, 6, 7, 9, 10)
 Ed McTaggart (5)
 Terry Scott Taylor (5, 9)
 Beau MacDougall (6)
 Janet McTaggart (7)
 Rachel Anderson (10)
 Shannon Berry (10)
 Audrey Floyd (10)
 Dori Howard (10)
 Jason Kinsley (10)
 Sharon McCall (10)
 Leslie Phillips (10)
 Colleen Routh (10)
 Moses Toth (10)
Jamaican choir on "Shut De Dó" 
 Terry Bradford, Jerry Chamberlain, Jackie Goushé, Tom and Dori Howard, Regina Peoples, Sharon McCall, Regina Peoples, Shari Larson and Randy Stonehill

Vocal appearances
 Terry Scott Taylor – man in the audience (2)
 Jerry Chamberlain – Ethel Merman's assailant (2), fast food patron (5)
 Regina Peoples – female soloist (3)
 Jackie Goushé, Dori Howard, Shari Larson and Sharon McCall – singing waitresses (5)
 Janet McTaggart – "Star Trek" soprano solo (10)

Production 
 Produced by Terry Scott Taylor for "Rebel Base Productions".
 Engineered by Thom Roy
 Recorded and Mixed at Whitefield Studios (Santa Ana, California).
 Mastered by Steve Hall at Future Disc Systems (Hollywood, California).
 Album Cover Concept – Terry Taylor and Randy Stonehill
 Art Direction – Paul Gross/Paradise Graphics, Ltd.
 Illustration – Kurt Triffet
 Inner Sleeve Photography – Charles Allen

References 

1983 albums
Randy Stonehill albums